is a public university in the city of Aomori, Aomori Prefecture, Japan. The school was established in 1993 as Aomori Public College. The English name for the university has changed since 2013.

Faculty

Faculty of Management and Economics 
This Faculty includes the following departments:
 Department of Management
 Department of Economics
 Department of Local Future

References

External links 
  

Educational institutions established in 1993
Public universities in Japan
Universities and colleges in Aomori Prefecture
1993 establishments in Japan
Aomori (city)